Churchill Public School may refer to:

Churchill Public School, in Rainbow District School Board, Canada
Churchill Public School (Cheyenne, Wyoming), United States

See also
Churchill School, Baker City, Oregon, United States